"Somewhere to Run" is a single by American electronic dance music band Krewella. The song was released on March 23, 2015 for digital download and streaming. It was featured in the trailer for the 2016 movie Nerve.

Background
About the sound of the track, Krewella stated:
"We went back to the roots for that one,” says Yasmine. “The reason why we fell in love with dance music is people like Daft Punk, Justice, MSTRKRFT ... all those people were doing this grungy, punk-y dance stuff and we wanted to channel that for the new song that’s out."

Music video
The video for the song was released onto YouTube on July 22, 2015. It features cameo performances from 3LAU and Rory Kramer. The video sheds light on issues such as self-harm and suicide. The music video was directed by Rory Kramer and uploaded to their official Vevo channel.

Critical reception

Matt Joseph from We Got This Covered gave "Somewhere to Run" a positive review stating, "After all, it's always exciting to see artists trying something different, no matter how it ends up working out."

Track listing

Charts

References

Columbia Records singles
2015 singles
2015 songs
Krewella songs